Syncesia afromontana is a rare species of byssoid lichen in the family Roccellaceae. Found in Rwanda, it was formally described as a new species in 2010 by Damien Ertz, Dorothee Killmann, Emmanuël Sérusiaux, and Eberhard Fischer. It is only known to occur at the type locality, where it grows on the trunks of Erica in thickets of Erica johnstonii as well as in forests of Hagenia abyssinica and Rapanea melanophloeios. It contains protocetraric acid as a major metabolite, and trace amounts of roccellic acid.

References

Roccellaceae
Lichen species
Lichens described in 2010
Lichens of Rwanda
Taxa named by Emmanuël Sérusiaux